Huevos motuleños is a breakfast food which originated in the town of Motul (Yucatán). The dish is made with eggs on tortillas with black beans and cheese, often with other ingredients such as ham, peas, plantains, and hot sauce. In addition to being served in many restaurants in Yucatán, Quintana Roo and Oaxaca, this breakfast dish is also common in Cuba and Costa Rica.

See also

 Huevos rancheros
 List of egg dishes
 List of Mexican dishes

References

Egg dishes
Mexican cuisine
Tortilla-based dishes
Yucatán